Mary Jane West-Eberhard (born 1941) is an American theoretical biologist noted for arguing that phenotypic and developmental plasticity played a key role in shaping animal evolution and speciation. She is also an entomologist notable for her work on the behavior and evolution of social wasps.

She is a member both of the United States National Academy of Sciences and the American Academy of Arts and Sciences. In 2005 she was elected to be a foreign member of the Italian Accademia dei Lincei. She has been a past president (1991) of the Society for the Study of Evolution. She won the 2003 R.R. Hawkins Award for the Outstanding Professional, Reference or Scholarly Work for her book Developmental Plasticity and Evolution (618 pages). In the same year she was the recipient of the Sewall Wright Award.  She has been selected as one of the 21 "Leaders in Animal Behavior".

She is engaged in long-term research projects at the Smithsonian Tropical Research Institute at the Escuela de Biologia, Universidad de Costa Rica.

Early life and education
West-Eberhard's mother was a primary school teacher, and her father, a small-town businessman, and as parents they encouraged her curiosity. She went to school in Plymouth Community Schools, Plymouth, Michigan. She recalls of her high school that the best scientific training "was an English course on critical reading and writing, taught by the school librarian. Biology class was just a workbook, an enormous disappointment for me."

She did all her degrees at the University of Michigan. She did her bachelor's degree from University of Michigan in zoology in 1963. She earned her master's degree from the same place in zoology in 1964, and then her PhD(zoology) in 1967.  There she was taught by Richard D. Alexander and had part-time employment in its Museum of Zoology. She records that "I also learned the excitement of being a sleuth in the university libraries where even an undergraduate could explore an idea beyond textbooks and could feel like a pioneer". She also corresponded with Edward Wilson on trophic eggs in insects, and spent summers at Woods Hole and Cali in Colombia.

She did postdoctoral work (1967–1969) at Harvard University with Howard Evans. There she met her husband. She then spent the next ten years (1969–1979) as an associate in biology at the University of Valle. In 1973 she began an association with the Smithsonian Tropical Research Institute in Costa Rica which became a full-time employment in 1986.

Social insects
West-Eberhard has studied many species of social wasps such as Polistes fuscatus, Polistes canadensis, and Polistes erythrocephalus. Through her studies she has investigated why wasps evolved from being casteless and nestsharing casteless to becoming highly specialized eusocial species using comparative studies of tropical wasps (Hymenoptera). She has argued that origins of nonreproductive females in social wasps involves mutualism rather than only kin selection or parental manipulation.

Her work upon social insects has played an  important role in the development of her ideas upon phenotypic plasticity. As she notes "From there I got interested in alternative phenotypes—alternative pathways and decision points during development, and their significance for evolution, especially for higher levels of organization, for speciation, and for macroevolutionary change without speciation."

Phenotypic plasticity
West-Eberhard has written from the mid-1980s upon  the role of "alternative phenotypes," such as polymorphisms, polyphenisms, and context sensitive phenotype life history and  physiological traits. This resulted in her 2003  book Developmental Plasticity and Evolution.

She argues that such alternative phenotypes are important since they can lead to novel traits, and then to genetic divergence and so speciation. Through alternative phenotypes environmental induction can take the lead in genetic evolution. Her book Developmental Plasticity and Evolution developed in detail how such environmental plasticity plays a key role in understanding the genetic theory of evolution. Her argument is full of examples from butterflies to elephants.

Sexual and social selection
West-Eberhard was among the first scientists  to reexamine Charles Darwin's ideas in The Descent of Man, and Selection in Relation to Sex about sexual selection and identify the key importance he gave to the "social competition for mates" as a factor in evolution    and speciation. She has noted how sexual selection can trap animals into sexual dimorphisms, to maintain separate sexes in sexual reproduction.

Other work
As a member of the United States National Academy of Sciences, West-Eberhard has served for three terms on its Committee on Human Rights. She has also been noted as "active in promoting the careers of young scientists, particularly those doing work in Latin America".

Since 2013, West-Eberhard has been listed on the Advisory Council of the National Center for Science Education.

Selected bibliography

Social wasps 
 1967. Foundress associations in polistine wasps: dominance hierarchies and the evolution of social behavior. Science 157(3796):1584-1585. 
 1969. The Social Biology of Polistine Wasps. Misc. Publ. Univ. Mich. Mus. Zool. 140:1-101. 
 1970. Wasps. (with H. E. Evans). University of Michigan Press, Ann Arbor. 
 1975. The evolution of social behavior by kin selection. Quart. Rev. Biol. 50(1):1-33. 
 1978. Temporary queens in Metapolybia wasps: Non-reproductive helpers without altruism? Science 200 (4340):441-443. 
 1987. Flexible strategy and social evolution. In Animal societies: Theories and facts, Y. Ito, J. L. Brown, and J. Kikkawa, eds., Japan Scientific Societies Press, Ltd., Tokyo, pp. 35–51. 
 1988. (with W. T. Wcislo and W. G. Eberhard). Natural history and behavior of a primitively social wasp Auplopus semialatus, and a parasite, Irenangelus eberhardi (Hymenoptera: Pompilidae). J. Insect Behavior 1(2):247-60.
 1996. Wasp societies as microcosms for the study of development and evolution., pp. 290–317. In Natural history and evolution of paper wasps. (editors, West-Eberhard, M-J. & S. Turillazzi) Oxford University Press, Oxford. 
 2005. (with T. Giray and M. Giovanetti) Juvenile hormone, reproduction, and worker behavior in the neotropical social wasp Polistes canadensis. Proceedings National Academy of Sciences USA 102(9):3330-3335. 
 2005.  The behavior of the primitively social wasp Montezumia cortesioides Willink (Vespidae, Eumeninae) and the origins of vespid sociality. Ecology Ethology and Evolution 17:51-65. 
2008. Inclusive fitness theory and eusociality. Nature. 471(7339):10.1038/nature09831. doi:10.1038/nature09831.

Phenotypical plasticity 
 1986.  Alternative adaptations, speciation, and phylogeny.  Proc Natl Acad Sci U S A. 83(5):1388-1392. 
 1989. Phenotypic plasticity and the origins of diversity. Annu. Rev. Ecol. Syst. 20:249-278.
 1998. Evolution in the light of developmental and cell biology, and vice versa. Proceedings National Academy of Sciences USA 95:8417-8419. 
 2002. Development and selection in adaptive evolution. Trends in Ecology & Evolution 17(2):65. 
 2003. Developmental plasticity and evolution. Oxford University Press, New York. 
 2005. Developmental plasticity and the origin of species differences. Proceedings National Academy of Sciences USA 102, Suppl. 1:6543-6549. 
 2005. Phenotypic accommodation: Adaptive innovation due to developmental plasticity. Journal of Experimental Zoology Part B ( Molecular and Developmental Evolution) 304B:610-618. 
 2007. Dancing with DNA and flirting with the ghost of Lamarck. Biology & Philosophy 22(3):439-451. 
 2007. Developmental Plasticity, Evolution and the origins of disease. in Nesse, R. (ed.), Evolution and Medicine: How New Applications Advance Research and Practice, The Biomedical & Life Sciences Collection, Henry Stewart Talks Ltd, London (online at http://www.hstalks.com/bio)
 2007.  Are genes good markers of biological traits? 175–193. In Biological Surveys. National Research Council Committee on Advances in Collecting and Utilizing Biological Indicators and Genetic Information in Social Science Surveys. Weinstein, M., Vaupel, J. W. and Wachter, K.W. (editors), National Academies Press, Washington.
 2008. Toward a Modern Revival of Darwin's Theory of Evolutionary Novelty. Philosophy of Science, 75:899-908.

Sexual selection 
 1979. Sexual selection, social competition, and evolution. Proc. Amer. Phil. Soc. 51(4):222-234.
 1983. Sexual selection, social competition, and speciation. Quart. Rev. Biol. 58(2):155-183.
 2005. The maintenance of sex as a developmental trap due to sexual selection. Quarterly Review of Biology 80(1):47-53. 
2014. Darwin's forgotten idea: The social essence of sexual selection Neuroscience & Biobehavioral Reviews. Volume 46, Part 4, October 2014, Pages 501-508

Other 
 2005. Howard E. Evans 1919-2002. Biographical Memoirs, Volume 86. National Academies Press, Washington, D.C., pp. 1–19.
 2005. (with P.C. Agre, S. Altman, F.R. Curl and T.N. Wiesel). Using ethics to fight bioterrorism. Science 309:1013-1014.

Honors and awards 
 1963. Phi Beta Kappa (University of Michigan)
1963. Phi Beta Kappa (University of Michigan)
1963. Woodrow Wilson Fellow (Hon.) 
1965-66. Rackham Fellow, University of Michigan 
1966. Edward C. Walker Scholar, University of Michigan 
1968-69. Milton Fellow, Harvard University 
1968. Summer Research Fellow, E.N. Huyck Preserve 
1982. Distinguished Visiting Scientist, University of Michigan Museum of Zoology 
1987. Elected Vice President, Society for the Study of Evolution 
1988. Elected Member National Academy of Sciences, U.S.A. 
1992. Elected President, Society for the Study of Evolution 
1996. Elected Member American Academy of Arts and Sciences 
2002. Elected Foreign Member National Academy of Sciences of Costa Rica
2003. Sewell Wright Award, American Society of Naturalists 
2003. Hawkins Award, American Association of Publishers (best scholarly book of 2003 (Developmental Plasticity and Evolution))
2004. Hamilton Lecturer, International Society of Behavioral Ecology, Jyvaskyla Finland
2005. Elected Foreign Member, Accademia Nazionale dei Lincei, Rome 
2009. Elected Fellow, Animal Behavior Society 
2010–present. Vice-chair, Committee on Human Rights, National Academy of Sciences USA, National Academy of Medicine, National Academy of Engineers 
2012. Quest Award for Lifetime Achievement, Animal Behavior Society
2014. Hamilton Award, International Union for the Study of Social Insects

References

External links
 Publications with pdfs
 Research Bibliography

1941 births
Living people
American entomologists
Women entomologists
21st-century American biologists
Extended evolutionary synthesis
Hymenopterists
Smithsonian Institution people
University of Michigan College of Literature, Science, and the Arts alumni
Harvard University alumni
University of Valle people
Members of the United States National Academy of Sciences
Fellows of the American Academy of Arts and Sciences
Evolutionary biologists
Women evolutionary biologists
20th-century American non-fiction writers
21st-century American non-fiction writers
20th-century American women writers
21st-century American women writers